12–13th & Locust station is a PATCO Speedline subway station in Washington Square West in Center City, Philadelphia. The station has a single island platform, with a fare mezzanine above. The mezzanine level connects to the Center City Pedestrian Concourse, which connects subway and regional rail stations in the Center City area.

PATCO plans to make the station accessible to people with disabilities, adding elevators between street level and the mezzanine, and between the mezzanine and the platform. The project was expected to be completed in Fall 2022.

References

External links 

Official website

PATCO Speedline stations in Philadelphia
Railway stations in Philadelphia
Railway stations in the United States opened in 1953
Railway stations located underground in Pennsylvania